Tancock is a surname. Notable people with the surname include:

Rachel Tancock (de Montmorency) (1891–1961), English painter and artist working in stained glass
Betty Tancock (1911–2009), Canadian swimmer who competed in the Olympic games in 1932 in Los Angeles
Liam Tancock (born 1985), English former competitive swimmer who represented Great Britain in the Olympics
O. W. Tancock (1839–1930), English clergyman, headmaster and author
Scott Tancock (born 1993), Welsh footballer